The 2018 WNBA season was the 22nd season for the Phoenix Mercury franchise of the WNBA. The season tipped off on May 14th.

The Mercury started the season slowly, going 2–3 in May.  They won the first two games, but lost the next three.  All five games were against eventual playoff teams.  However, the Mercury caught fire in June, posting an 11–2 record which included an 8 game winning streak.  The June high turned into a July low.  The team was 2–7 in July with their only wins coming against Connecticut, and league-worst Indiana.  The Mercury managed to turn it around and end the season on a high, going 5–2 in August.  Their regular season ended on a three game winning streak, with all games coming against playoff teams.  The Mercury finished the season 20–14, with the 5th seed in the 2018 WNBA Playoffs.

As the fifth seed, the Mercury had to play an opening round game against the Dallas Wings at home.  The Mercury won by 18 points, 101–83.  This win saw them advance to the second round where they played the fourth seeded Connecticut Sun in Connecticut.  Again, the Mercury won, this time by 10 points.  With the win, the Mercury advanced to the Semifinals to face the first seeded Seattle Storm.  The home team won each game in the five game series.  However, the Mercury did not have home court advantage, due to being the lower seed, and lost the series 2–3.

Transactions

WNBA Draft

Trades/Roster Changes

Current roster

Game log

Pre-season

|- style="background:#fcc;"
| 1
| May 8
| @ Seattle
| L 69–73
| Bonner (13)
| Tied (6)
| 3 Tied (3)
| KeyArena3,502
| 0–1
|- style="background:#fcc;"
| 2
| May 12
| Seattle
| L 61–84
| Griner (14)
| Lyttle (11)
| Bonner (4)
| Talking Stick Resort Arena4,535
| 0–2

Regular season

|- style="background:#bbffbb;"
| 1
| May 18
| Dallas
| W 86–78
| Taurasi (26)
| Bonner (12)
| Mitchell (5)
| Talking Stick Resort Arena11,210
| 1–0
|- style="background:#bbffbb;"
| 2
| May 20
| @ Seattle
| W 87–82
| Griner (29)
| Griner (10)
| Bonner (7)
| KeyArena8,602
| 2–0
|- style="background:#fcc;"
| 3
| May 23
| Seattle
| L 71–87
| Taurasi (23)
| Bonner (9)
| Lyttle (4)
| Talking Stick Resort Arena8,068
| 2–1
|- style="background:#fcc;"
| 4
| May 27
| @ Los Angeles
| L 72–80
| Lyttle (20)
| Tied (5)
| January (7)
| Staples Center11,201
| 2–2
|- style="background:#fcc;"
| 5
| May 30
| Washington
| L 95–103
| Griner (27)
| Lyttle (7)
| Taurasi (7)
| Talking Stick Resort Arena8,188
| 2–3

|- style="background:#bbffbb;"
| 6
| June 1
| @ Minnesota
| W 95–85
| Taurasi (29)
| Griner (9)
| Taurasi (6)
| Target Center8,830
| 3–3
|- style="background:#bbffbb;"
| 7
| June 3
| @ Atlanta
| W 78–71
| Tied (20)
| Tied (7)
| Taurasi (8)
| McCamish Pavilion3,796
| 4–3
|- style="background:#bbffbb;"
| 8
| June 5
| @ New York
| W 80–74
| Griner (26)
| Griner (6)
| Taurasi (8)
| Madison Square Garden7,215
| 5–3
|- style="background:#bbffbb;"
| 9
| June 8
| Chicago
| W 96–79
| Griner (24)
| Griner (8)
| Taurasi (7)
| Talking Stick Resort Arena8,834
| 6–3
|- style="background:#bbffbb;"
| 10
| June 10
| Las Vegas
| W 72–66
| Taurasi (25)
| Griner (15)
| January (4)
| Talking Stick Resort Arena8,471
| 7–3
|- style="background:#bbffbb;"
| 11
| June 12
| @ Dallas
| W 75–72
| Taurasi (21)
| Lyttle (10)
| January (6)
| College Park Center4,026
| 8–3
|- style="background:#bbffbb;"
| 12
| June 16
| Connecticut
| W 89–72
| Taurasi (19)
| Tied (9)
| January (8)
| Talking Stick Resort Arena12,497
| 9–3
|- style="background:#bbffbb;"
| 13
| June 17
| @ Las Vegas
| W 92–80
| Taurasi (28)
| Bonner (9)
| Taurasi (7)
| Mandalay Bay Events Center4,432
| 10–3
|- style="background:#fcc;"
| 14
| June 22
| Minnesota
| L 72–83
| Taurasi (23)
| Griner (13)
| Taurasi (6)
| Talking Stick Resort Arena11,349
| 10–4
|- style="background:#fcc;"
| 15
| June 24
| @ Chicago
| L 88–97
| Griner (19)
| Griner (10)
| Taurasi (8)
| Wintrust Arena4,741
| 10–5
|- style="background:#bbffbb;"
| 16
| June 26
| @ New York
| W 83–69
| Taurasi (27)
| Griner (9)
| Taurasi (7)
| Westchester County Center1,839
| 11–5
|- style="background:#bbffbb;"
| 17
| June 29
| @ Indiana
| W 95–77
| Taurasi (25)
| Bonner (9)
| Turner (7)
| Bankers Life Fieldhouse7,241
| 12–5
|- style="background:#bbffbb;"
| 18
| June 30
| @ Washington
| W 84–74
| Griner (24)
| Turner (9)
| Taurasi (9)
| Capital One Arena6,218
| 13–5

|- style="background:#bbffbb;"
| 19
| July 5
| Connecticut
| W 84–77
| Taurasi (25)
| Bonner (13)
| Turner (5)
| Talking Stick Resort Arena8,599
| 14–5
|- style="background:#fcc;"
| 20
| July 8
| @ Atlanta
| L 70–76
| Taurasi (19)
| Robinson (10)
| 3 Tied (3)
| McCamish Pavilion3,952
| 14–6
|- style="background:#fcc;"
| 21
| July 10
| @ Dallas
| L 72–101
| Griner (21)
| Tied (4)
| Mitchell (8)
| College Park Center4,034
| 14–7
|- style="background:#fcc;"
| 22
| July 13
| @ Connecticut
| L 87–91
| Taurasi (28)
| Tied (7)
| Tied (6)
| Mohegan Sun Arena7,696
| 14–8
|- style="background:#bbffbb;"
| 23
| July 15
| @ Indiana
| W 101–82
| Griner (36)
| Griner (12)
| Taurasi (7)
| Bankers Life Fieldhouse6,302
| 15–8
|- style="background:#fcc;"
| 24
| July 19
| Las Vegas
| L 82–85
| Taurasi (33)
| Robinson (11)
| Taurasi (6)
| Talking Stick Resort Arena8,587
| 15–9
|- style="background:#fcc;"
| 25
| July 21
| Minnesota
| L 75–80
| Bonner (29)
| Little (6)
| Talbot (3)
| Talking Stick Resort Arena11,473
| 15–10
|- style="background:#fcc;"
| 26
| July 25
| Chicago
| L 87–101
| Bonner (30)
| Bonner (13)
| January (7)
| Talking Stick Resort Arena10,338
| 15–11
|- style="background:#fcc;"
| 27
| July 31
| Seattle
| L 91–102
| Griner (25)
| Griner (6)
| Tied (7)
| Talking Stick Resort Arena10,005
| 15–12

|- style="background:#bbffbb;"
| 28
| August 1
| @ Las Vegas
| W 104–93
| Taurasi (37)
| Bonner (14)
| Taurasi (9)
| Mandalay Bay Events Center5,129
| 16–12
|- style="background:#fcc;"
| 29
| August 5
| @ Los Angeles
| L 75–78
| Griner (22)
| Bonner (9)
| January (9)
| Staples Center19,076
| 16–13
|- style="background:#fcc;"
| 30
| August 7
| Washington
| L 98–103
| Griner (35)
| Griner (11)
| Talbot (6)
| Talking Stick Resort Arena7,769
| 16–14
|- style="background:#bbffbb;"
| 31
| August 10
| Indiana
| W 94–74
| Tied (14)
| Bonner (10)
| Griner (4)
| Talking Stick Resort Arena8,860
| 17–14
|- style="background:#bbffbb;"
| 32
| August 12
| Los Angeles
| W 86–78
| Bonner (31)
| Griner (13)
| Taurasi (14)
| Talking Stick Resort Arena10,618
| 18–14
|- style="background:#bbffbb;"
| 33
| August 17
| Atlanta
| W 104–95
| Griner (33)
| Griner (18)
| Taurasi (14)
| Talking Stick Resort Arena11,177
| 19–14
|- style="background:#bbffbb;"
| 34
| August 19
| New York
| W 96–85
| Bonner (23)
| Bonner (10)
| Tied (5)
| Talking Stick Resort Arena13,106
| 20–14

Playoffs

|- style="background:#bbffbb;"
| 1
| August 21
| Dallas
| W 101–83
| Bonner (29)
| Tied (11)
| Taurasi (12)
| Wells Fargo Arena4,976
| 1–0

|- style="background:#bbffbb;"
| 1
| August 23
| @ Connecticut
| W 96–86
| Tied (27)
| Bonner (18)
| 3 Tied (5)
| Mohegan Sun Arena7,858
| 1–0

|- style="background:#fcc;"
| 1
| August 26
| @ Seattle
| L 87–91
| Bonner (27)
| Bonner (13)
| Taurasi (6)
| KeyArena9,686
| 0–1
|- style="background:#fcc;"
| 2
| August 28
| @ Seattle
| L 87–91 (OT)
| Taurasi (28)
| Griner (10)
| Taurasi (8)
| KeyArena9,686
| 0–2
|- style="background:#bbffbb;"
| 3
| August 31
| Seattle
| W 86–66
| Bonner (27)
| Bonner (11)
| Turner (6)
| Talking Stick Resort Arena15,185
| 1–2
|-style="background:#bbffbb;"
| 4
| September 2
| Seattle
| W 86–84
| Griner (29)
| Griner (12)
| Taurasi (4)
| Talking Stick Resort Arena8,137
| 2–2
|-style="background:#fcc;"
| 5
| September 4
| @ Seattle
| 84–94
| Griner (21)
| Griner (9)
| Griner (6)
| KeyArena8,992
| 2–3

Standings

Playoffs

Statistics

Regular season

Awards and honors

References

External links
The Official Site of the Phoenix Mercury

Phoenix Mercury seasons
Phoenix Mercury